Live at the Fillmore 1997 is a 2022 live album compiling Tom Petty and the Heartbreakers 20-concert residency at The Fillmore in San Francisco in January and February 1997. The album includes 58 tracks pulled primarily from the last six concerts performed in the residency. Those six shows were professionally recorded and tracks from the setlists in those shows have seen previously released on The Live Anthology and the 2020 expanded reissue of Petty's 1994 album Wildflowers.

Tom Petty considered the residency by the Heartbreakers at the Fillmore "a highlight of his career" and guitarist Mike Campbell labeled the concerts "some of my favorite gigs ever." During the final concert at the Fillmore, Petty remarked to the audience that, "We all feel this might be the highpoint of our time together as a group… It’s going to be hard to get us off this stage tonight."

In addition to a selection of the Heartbreakers and Tom Petty's solo tracks from their career by 1997, the residency and the album documented the band's music interests and featured performances by guests such as Roger McGuinn and John Lee Hooker. Of the 58 songs included in the collection, 35 are covers of songs by those that influenced, inspired, or performed with Tom Petty and the Heartbreakers. The first two singles released from the set in September and October 2022 highlighted performances of "Listen to Her Heart" and "I Won't Back Down," while the third single released in early November 2022, "Call Me the Breeze," showcased one of three tracks originally by J. J. Cale covered by the band during the Fillmore residency.

Track listing
The album was released across a variety of formats, the following track list represents the four CD deluxe version.

Personnel

Tom Petty and the Heartbreakers
 Tom Petty – lead vocals, rhythm guitar, lead guitar, harmonica
 Mike Campbell – lead guitar, mandolin
 Benmont Tench – backing vocals, keyboards, piano, organ
 Howie Epstein – backing vocals, bass guitar
 Scott Thurston – backing vocals, rhythm guitar, harmonica, lead vocals on "Little Maggie"
 Steve Ferrone – drums, percussion

Production
 Mike Campbell – producer, curator
 Ryan Ulyate – producer, curator
 Benmont Tench – executive producer
 Adria Petty – executive producer
 Annakim Petty – executive producer
 Dana Petty – executive producer

Charts

References 

Tom Petty albums
2022 albums
Warner Records albums
Albums produced by Mike Campbell (musician)
Tom Petty compilation albums
Tom Petty live albums
2022 live albums
2022 compilation albums
Warner Records live albums
Warner Records compilation albums